Nanna is the eighth studio album recorded by Xavier Rudd and the United Nations, a band featuring a diverse group of musicians from Australia, South Africa, Samoa, Germany, Ireland and Papua New Guinea. The album was recorded and self-produced in Australia and mixed by Errol Brown in Jamaica.

Reception

In his review for AllMusic, Thom Jurek calls Rudd's work on Nanna "far more collaborative than anything he's done before." On the first single, "Come People", "Rudd's vocals are urgent, layered just above backing vocalists Georgia Carowa and Alicia Mellor, whose chants underscore his lines", but it's the United Nations collective who are the voice of the album. Jurek believes "Rudd reveals himself as a gifted bandleader and arranger" allowing the United Nations to shine "in this ambitious mix."

Dan Lander of Rolling Stone Australia wrote, "Nanna is a beautiful celebration of global sound, the only flaw being that Rudd's own unique voice gets a little lost in all that egalitarianism."

Track listing

Personnel
 Bobby Alu – Drums, percussion
 Georgia Carowa – Backing vocals  
 Stuart Currie – Trombone
 Eddie Elias – Fender Rhodes, Hammond organ, piano
 Peter Hunt – Trumpet
 Simon Keet – Synthesizer
 Chris Lane – Bansuri, tenor sax
 Alicia Mellor – Backing vocals
 Tio Moloantoa – Bass
 Yeshe Reiners – Ngoni, percussion
 Xavier Rudd – Guitar, vocals, Weissenborn, Yidaki

Charts

References

2015 albums
Xavier Rudd albums